Eureka Club-Farr's Point is a resort cottage on the southern end of Wilmington Island, Georgia.  It overlooks the marshes of the Wilmington River on the west and Sheepsheads Creek (maybe a branch of Halfmoon River) on the east.  It was built in 1891 for seasonal use as a club and was later used as a private vacation house. 

The one-story main house is L-shaped and has been expanded over the years.  It is raised on cedar posts.  The two chimneys have corbel caps.

The property includes a small pump house with a cylindrical water tank on a platform.

References

		
National Register of Historic Places in Chatham County, Georgia
Buildings and structures in Chatham County, Georgia
Buildings and structures completed in 1891
Chatham County, Georgia
1891 establishments in Georgia (U.S. state)